The Flandriencross is a cyclo-cross race held since 2002 in Hamme, Belgium, until 2013 it was known as the Bollekescross but was renamed in 2014 in honour of Greg Van Avermaet who was raised in Hamme and is a multiple times winner of the Flandrien of the Year award. 
Since the 2004–2005 season, the cross is a part of the Superprestige but since the 2014–2015 season, it is now part of the BPost Bank Trophy.

Past winners

Men

Women

References
 Results

Cycle races in Belgium
Cyclo-cross races
Recurring sporting events established in 2002
2002 establishments in Belgium
Cyclo-cross Superprestige
Sport in East Flanders
Hamme